Sukhjit Singh (born 3 May 1996) is an Indian-born first-class cricketer. He made his first-class debut on 2 April 2017 for Warwickshire against Oxford MCCU as part of the Marylebone Cricket Club University fixtures.

References

External links
 

1996 births
Living people
English cricketers
Warwickshire cricketers
Place of birth missing (living people)
Staffordshire cricketers
Indian emigrants to the United Kingdom
British Asian cricketers
British sportspeople of Indian descent